Lightning Strikes Twice is the seventh studio album by American southern rock band Molly Hatchet, released in 1989 (see 1989 in music). This was the band's first album not released on Epic Records, and their first one with guitarist Bobby Ingram, replacing founding member Dave Hlubek. Although the album did not enter the Billboard charts, it included their last charting single to date "There Goes the Neighborhood". Lightning Strikes Twice would also be the band's last album before their temporary breakup in 1990 and the last one to feature vocalist Danny Joe Brown, guitarist Duane Roland, bassist Riff West and drummer Bruce Crump.

Track listing
"Take Miss Lucy Home" (Ronald Perry, Frank Wildhorn) – 3:12
"There Goes the Neighborhood" (Tom Miller, Rocky Burnette) – 3:45
"No Room on the Crew" (William Little, Ed Raetzloff, J.B. Smith) – 3:27
"Find Somebody New" (Riff West, Danny Joe Brown, Bruce Crump, John Galvin, Bobby Ingram, Duane Roland) – 3:11
"The Big Payback" (Mike Causey, Rob Walker) – 4:35
"I Can't Be Watching You" (Galvin, Ingram, Brown, Roland, Crump, West) – 6:01
"Goodbye to Love" (Galvin, Ingram, Roland, Crump, West, Brown) – 5:30
"Hide Your Heart" (Desmond Child, Paul Stanley, Holly Knight) – 4:38 (Bonnie Tyler cover)
"What's the Story, Old Glory" (Steve Carlisle, Dave Ivory, Kurt Palomaki, Galvin, West, Roland, Crump, Ingram, Brown) – 3:21
"Heart of My Soul" (Galvin, Ingram, West, Crump, Brown, Roland) – 5:33

Personnel
Molly Hatchet
Danny Joe Brown - vocals, harmonica
Bobby Ingram - Acoustic, lead, rhythm guitars, backing vocals
Duane Roland - lead, acoustic, slide and rhythm guitars, backing vocals, assistant producer
John Galvin - keyboards, synthesizer, backing vocals
Riff West - bass, backing vocals
Bruce Crump - drums, backing vocals

Additional musicians
Amy Martin, Carol Becker Rizzo, Randy Nichols, Sara Moore - backing vocals

Production
Pat Armstrong - producer, mixing
Andy DeGanahl - producer, engineer, mixing
Bill Smith, Jeff Heisey, Mike Chadbourne, Scott Taylor, Wayne Cloughley - assistant engineers
George Marino - mastering at Sterling Sound, New York
Ezra Tucker - illustration

Charts

Singles

References

Molly Hatchet albums
1989 albums
Capitol Records albums